Regulations.gov is a U.S. Federal government web site that acts as an "Internet portal and document repository" that allows members of the public to participate in the rulemaking processes of some Federal government agencies.  

The site allows users to make public comments in response to notices of proposed rulemaking issued by participating agencies; such comments become part of the public record and may be displayed on the site.

See also
 Federal Register
 Code of Federal Regulations
 eRulemaking

References

External links
 

United States administrative law
Government services web portals in the United States
Government databases in the United States
Online law databases